Chilean–Ecuadorian relations refer to official and bilateral tie between Chile and Ecuador. Two countries have embassies in respective capitals.

The two nations build a strong and strategic alliance as both Ecuador and Chile share common foe toward Peru, and till this day, two countries have boosted strong cooperation.

History
Chile and Ecuador were both parts of the Spanish Empire until the Latin American wars of independence that saw Ecuador and Chile together freed from Spanish domination. However, in most of mid-19th century, Chile and Ecuador were mostly trade partners and little to none of their relations had been recorded.

However, due to the War of the Pacific, Chile and Ecuador became strategic allies as relations with Peru worsened. Chile had invaded Peru during the war, while Ecuador had historical boundary conflict with Peru. This strategic alliance boosted as Ecuador and Chile together faced increasing Peruvian scrutiny toward two countries, and the strategic alliance remains still today. Military cooperation with Ecuador grew considerably after the War of the Pacific with Chile sending instructors to the military academy in Quito and selling superfluous arms and munitions to Ecuador. Despite Chile's over-all good relations with Ecuador both countries had a minor diplomatic crisis resulting from the capture of the Peruvian torpedo boat Alay in Ecuadorian territorial waters during the war.

Throughout the 20th century, Ecuador and Chile had deepened their alliance. Though Chile was part of ABC Pact composing Brazil, Chile and Argentina, Chile had sided with Ecuador in a number of conflict with Peru. Chile acted as mediator for Ecuador during the 1941 Ecuadorian–Peruvian War. Chile together with the other ABC Powers and the USA were among the guarantors of the Rio Protocol that followed the Ecuadorian–Peruvian War in 1942.

Chile had secretly supported Ecuador during the Cenepa War against Peru, providing worth 600 million dollars arms for Ecuadorian Armed Forces. Peru had accused Chile for meddling on its affairs and demanded Chile to stay out from the conflict. Chile also helped negotiating for Ecuador post-Cenepa War.

Economic and military cooperation
Ecuador and Chile have increased their humanitarian and economic collaboration. There is a strong student exchange between Ecuador and Chile. Chile and Ecuador also have strong economic ties as two nations work in agriculture, industrialization and natural resource collaboration.

Two countries also share military and defensive pact.

Diplomatic missions 
Chile has an embassy in Quito and a consulate-general in Guayaquil. Ecuador has an embassy in Santiago.

References

Chile
Chile–Ecuador relations
Ecuador